The 1963 Preakness Stakes was the 88th running of the $200,000 Preakness Stakes thoroughbred horse race. The race took place on May 18, 1963, and was televised in the United States on the CBS television network. Candy Spots, who was jockeyed by Bill Shoemaker, won the race by three and one half lengths over runner-up Chateaugay. Approximate post time was 5:48 p.m. Eastern Time. The race was run over a distance of a mile and one-sixteenth on a fast track in a final time of 1:56-1/5.  The Maryland Jockey Club reported total attendance of 35,263, this is recorded as second highest on the list of American thoroughbred racing top attended events for North America in 1963.

Payout 

The 88th Preakness Stakes Payout Schedule

The full chart 

 Winning Breeder: Rex C. Ellsworth; (KY)
 Winning Time: 1:56 1/5
 Track Condition: Fast
 Total Attendance: 35,263

References

External links 
 

1963
1963 in horse racing
1963 in American sports
1963 in sports in Maryland
May 1963 sports events in the United States
Horse races in Maryland